Shamzan-e Jehadiyeh (also romanized as Shamzān-e Jehādīyeh; also known as Shamzān) is a village in Qaleh Ganj Rural District, in the Central District of Qaleh Ganj County, Kerman Province, Iran. At the 2006 census, its population was 834, in 163 families.

References 

Populated places in Qaleh Ganj County